"Marta tiene un marcapasos / La cagaste, Burt Lancaster" is the second single released by  Spanish rock band Hombres G.  The title song is an early version of the single from their album, La cagaste... Burt Lancaster. It was released at the same time as "Milagro en el Congo / Venezia" and through their first label, Lollipop. 

The Lollipop label was undergoing difficult financial circumstances at the end of 1983 and new recordings were delayed during 1984, until the group decide to split after a last performance in October. Luckily, in this event, they meet with Paco Martin, owner of Twins Records and quickly they signed with the new record label.

"Marta tiene un marcapasos" was re-recorded and a completely new version included on their second album, La cagaste... Burt Lancaster, while only a 1986 demo of "La cagaste, Burt Lancaster" has been subsequently released on Peligrosamente Juntos.

Track listing
Marta tiene un marcapasos / La cagaste, Burt Lancaster 

"Marta tiene un marcapasos" - 1:56
"La cagaste, Burt Lancaster" - 3:29

Personnel
Hombres G 
 David Summers - lead vocals, bass
 Rafa Gutierrez - guitar, vocals
 Javier Molina - drums, vocals
 Danny Hardy - guitar, piano, vocals

References

External links
 Official site
 Discography
 Hombres G: Albums, Songs, Bios, Photos at Amazon.com

1983 singles
Hombres G songs